Jonathan Yoni Laham, known professionally as Bridge (stylized as BRIDGE) is an American singer, songwriter and producer from Los Angeles. Debuting with the single "Roll My Weed" featuring Schoolboy Q in 2014, Bridge gained fame in 2019 for the song "GOMF", collaborating with DVBBS. He has released the albums Wreck (2017) and Smug (2019). In 2019, Bridge became the co-founder of gender neutral jewelry line Martyre, created with Anwar Hadid. In the same year, Bridge also launched his independent record label XX Recordings.

Life and career 

Bridge grew up in Beverly Hills, California in Los Angeles County. After being kicked out of several private schools, Bridge attended Beverly Hills High School. He began creating music in 2011, choosing the stage name Bridges due to his ability to cross genres. In 2014, Bridge debuted as a musician with the song "Roll My Weed" featuring Schoolboy Q, and planned to release a debut extended play produced by Malay and Robin Hannibal, however the release never eventuated.
 
In late 2017, Bridge released his debut album Wreck through Warner Records. In May 2019, Bridge became the co-founder of the gender neutral jewelry company Martyre, which he created alongside Anwar Hadid. In the same month, Bridge's collaboration with DVBBS, entitled "GOMF", became a hit on the Billboard Dance/Electronic Songs chart, which was followed by his second album Smug in June.
 
In 2019, Bridge formed the independent label XX Recordings, releasing his first single through the label, "DYDRM", in November 2019. During the COVID-19 pandemic in California, Bridge released eight singles in the course of 2020. Bridge plans to release a self-titled extended play in the first half of 2021.

Personal life

In 2016, Bridge was linked romantically to British musician Rita Ora.

Discography

Studio albums

Singles

As lead artist

As featured artist

Guest appearances

References

 

21st-century American businesspeople
21st-century American jewellers
21st-century American male musicians
21st-century American rappers
American fashion businesspeople
American hip hop record producers
American music industry executives
Beverly Hills High School alumni
Businesspeople from Los Angeles
Musicians from California
Living people
Record producers from California
Warner Records artists
Songwriters from California
Date of birth missing (living people)
Year of birth missing (living people)
American male songwriters